This article contains information about the literary events and publications of 1508.

Events
April 4 – John Lydgate's poem The Complaint of the Black Knight becomes the first book printed in Scotland, from the Chepman and Myllar Press in Edinburgh.
unknown date 
The earliest known printed edition of the chivalric romance Amadis de Gaula, as edited and expanded by Garci Rodríguez de Montalvo (died c. 1505), is published in Castilian at Zaragoza.
Elia Levita completes writing the Bovo-Bukh in Yiddish.
Estimated date of Manuscript D of Leonardo da Vinci's treatise on painting.

New books

Prose
Desiderius Erasmus – Adagiorum chiliades (2nd ed., Venice)
Johannes Trithemius – De septem secundeis

Drama
Ludovico Ariosto – La Cassaria
The World and the Child (possible date)

Poetry

William Dunbar
The Flyting of Dunbar and Kennedy, and Other Poems
The Goldyn Targe

Births
April 3 – Jean Daurat (or Dorat), French poet and scholar, member of La Pléiade (died 1588)
April 23 – Georg Sabinus, German poet, diplomat and academic (died 1560)
June 13 – Alessandro Piccolomini, Italian humanist philosopher, translator and playwright (died 1579)
December 21 – Thomas Naogeorgus, German Protestant reformer and Latin-language playwright (died 1563)
Unknown dates
Marin Držić, Croatian dramatist, author and poet (died 1567)
Isabel de Josa, Catalan writer (died 1575)
Primož Trubar, Slovene Protestant reformer, pioneer of Slovenian written language (died 1586)

Deaths
February 4 – Conrad Celtes, German and Latin-language poet (born 1459)
May 13 – Martial d'Auvergne, French poet (born 1420)
June 6 – Ercole Strozzi, Italian poet, murdered (born 1471)
August 27 – Hieronymus Münzer, co-author of the Nuremberg Chronicle (born 1437/47)

References

1508

1508 books
Years of the 16th century in literature